Howard Trevor Tunnicliffe (born 4 March 1950) is a former cricketer who played for Nottinghamshire between 1971 and 1980.  He later attended Loughborough University, and was director of cricket at Loughborough Grammar School from 1995 until his retirement in 2013.

References

1950 births
Nottinghamshire cricketers
English cricketers
Living people